Xootr (pronounced "zoo-ter") is a manufacturer of folding kick scooters and was formerly a seller of folding bicycles. Xootr scooters are characterized by 180 mm wheels with aluminium hubs, and a hand brake for the front wheel (for the rear on old models). One defining feature of Xootr scooters is the relatively large wheels they are equipped with, as well as the hinge system, which uses a pin. 

Xootr scooters were originally introduced in 1999 by Nova Cruz Products. Since 2003, the Xootr scooter has been manufactured and sold by Xootr LLC.

Manufacturer
Xootr began when Karl Ulrich, Nathan Ulrich, and Tom Miner (along with partners Lunar Design and Cheskin Research, and several other investors) founded Nova Cruz Products. Nova Cruz designed, manufactured and sold the Xootr kick scooter, the Xootr eX3 electric scooter, and the Voloci electric motorbike.

Products

Kick scooter models

Swift folding bicycle (discontinued)
The Swift Folder is a folding bicycle, designed by Peter Reich of Design Mobility Inc. of Brooklyn, New York, in collaboration with Jan VanderTuin of the Center for Appropriate Transport in Eugene, Oregon. The Swift Folder folds more quickly, though less compactly, than many other folding bicycles. From 2004 until about the end of 2016, the bicycle was sold under license by Xootr as the Xootr Swift - fully assembled to a standard specification, in a choice of single or 8-speed models

Bicycle rack system

The Xootr CrossRack Bicycle Rack enables the mounting of a standard bicycle bag to almost any bicycle especially on bicycles with small wheels.

Hand trucks

Xootr markets a line of folding hand trucks

Clothing
Xootr markets its own line of baseball caps and tee-shirts.

Wheels 
Xootr wheels were originally sold in two styles: standard (translucent yellow) and ultra (black), with the ultra wheels having 10% lower rolling resistance.

Teams using Xootr wheels with a custom rubber formulation swept the top three places at the All-American Soap Box Derby Ultimate Speed championships in July 2008.

In popular culture
The Xootr was featured in the film Little Manhattan, where a Xootr Street serves as the primary means of transportation for the main character, Gabe. In one scene, one of his friends has a Xootr Ultra Cruz while another friend makes do with a Razor.

References

External links
 Xootr USA website
 Xootr Australia website
 Xootr Israel website
 UK web site
 Xootr Europe

Human-powered vehicles
Folding bicycles
Kick scooters